The Shadow-Line is a short novel based at sea by Joseph Conrad; it is one of his later works, being written from February to December 1915. It was first published in 1916 as a serial in New York's Metropolitan Magazine (September—October) in the English Review (September 1916-March 1917) and published in book form in 1917 in the UK (March) and America (April). The novella depicts the development of a young man upon taking a captaincy in the Orient, with the shadow line of the title representing the threshold of this development.

The novella is notable for its dual narrative structure. The full, subtitled title of the novel is The Shadow-Line, A Confession, which immediately alerts the reader to the retrospective nature of the novella. The ironic constructions following from the conflict between the 'young' protagonist (who is never named) and the 'old' drive much of the underlying points of the novella, namely the nature of wisdom, experience and maturity. Conrad also extensively uses irony by comparison in the work, with characters such as Captain Giles and the ship's 'factotum' Ransome used to emphasise strengths and weaknesses of the protagonist.

The novel has often been cited as a metaphor of the First World War, given its timing and references to a long struggle and the importance of camaraderie. This viewpoint may also be reinforced by the knowledge that Conrad's elder son, Borys, was wounded in the First World War. Others however see the novel as having a strong supernatural influence, referring to various plot-lines in the novella such as the 'ghost' of the previous captain potentially cursing the ship, and the madness of first mate Mr Burns. Conrad himself, however, denied this link in his 'Author's Note' (1920), claiming that although critics had attempted to show this link, "The world of the living contains enough marvels and mysteries as it is."

Georges Franju made a 1973 television film La ligne d'ombre based on the novel. Andrzej Wajda made a 1976 film adaptation of the novel under its Polish title - Smuga cienia.

In the 2004 novel (trs 2005) House of Paper by Carlos Maria Dominguez the plot is driven by the narrator's quest for the person who sent a copy of The Shadow Line to a recently deceased colleague.

References

External links 

 
 Analysis of The Shadow Line at Modernism Lab Essays

1917 British novels
Novellas by Joseph Conrad
British novellas
J. M. Dent books
British novels adapted into films
Novels set on ships